Khaled Gahwji [خالد قهوجي in Arabic] (born July 7, 1975) is a Saudi football player.

Honours

Club
Al-Ahli (Jeddah)
Crown Prince Cup: 1997, 2003.
Saudi Federation Cup: 2001, 2002.
Gulf Club Champions Cup: 2002.
Arab Champions League: 2003.

National Team
Saudi Arabia football National team
1999 FIFA Confederations Cup: 4th Place

References

1975 births
Living people
Saudi Arabian footballers
Al-Ahli Saudi FC players
Ittihad FC players
Jeddah Club players
Sportspeople from Jeddah
Saudi First Division League players
Saudi Professional League players
Association football midfielders